Pascal Camia (born 13 November 1966) is a Monegasque bobsledder. He competed at the 1992, 1994 and the 1998 Winter Olympics.

References

1966 births
Living people
Monegasque male bobsledders
Olympic bobsledders of Monaco
Bobsledders at the 1992 Winter Olympics
Bobsledders at the 1994 Winter Olympics
Bobsledders at the 1998 Winter Olympics
People from Monte Carlo